Cryphoeca is a genus of araneomorph spiders in the family Cybaeidae, and was first described by Tamerlan Thorell in 1870. The name means hidden, in reference to its preference for hiding under loose bark or in stone walls.

Species
 it contains twelve species and one subspecies:
Cryphoeca angularis Saito, 1934 – Japan
Cryphoeca brignolii Thaler, 1980 – Switzerland, Italy
Cryphoeca carpathica Herman, 1879 – Eastern Europe
Cryphoeca exlineae Roth, 1988 – USA
Cryphoeca lichenum L. Koch, 1876 – Germany, Austria
Cryphoeca l. nigerrima Thaler, 1978 – Germany, Austria
Cryphoeca montana Emerton, 1909 – USA, Canada
Cryphoeca nivalis Schenkel, 1919 – Switzerland, Austria, Italy
Cryphoeca pirini (Drensky, 1921) – Bulgaria, Turkey
Cryphoeca shingoi Ono, 2007 – Japan
Cryphoeca shinkaii Ono, 2007 – Japan
Cryphoeca silvicola (C. L. Koch, 1834) (type) – Europe, Turkey, Russia (Europe to Far East), Japan
Cryphoeca thaleri Wunderlich, 1995 – Turkey

References

 
Araneomorphae genera
Cybaeidae
Holarctic spiders
Taxa named by Tamerlan Thorell